NIAA may refer to:

National Indigenous Australians Agency, an Australian government agency formed 2019
National Indigenous Arts Awards, Australia
 Nebraska Intercollegiate Athletic Association, American intercollegiate athletic conference, 1928–1942
 Nevada Interscholastic Activities Association, an association in Nevada, United States
 Northern Ireland Association of Aeromodellers, an organization in Northern Ireland, United Kingdom
 Northwest Intercollegiate Athletic Association, an amateur athletics federation in the United States, 1902–1914